Jacques le Roux (born 21 May 1981 as Hermanus Jacobus le Roux) is a South African tenor, concert, and opera singer.

Life and person 
Born in South Africa in Colenzo-Ladysmith in the then province of Natal, Jacques le Roux discovered his passion for music at an early age. His mother, an organist in the local church, took his early music education upon herself by giving him his first music lessons. Pursuing a better life, the family relocated to Vereeniging, a city in Transvaal now known as Gauteng, where Jacques le Roux at the age of 14 started studying piano and clarinet at the local gymnasium conservatory. It was during these years that he discovered his singing talent. This finally led him to further his music studies at the Conservatorium of the North-West University in Potchefstroom, where he studied voice under Prof. Werner Nel. In 2006 the singer went abroad to the Netherlands and Germany in pursuing an international opera career. He now resides in Austria.

Career 
As a student in his native South Africa, Jacques le Roux had already sung in many student opera productions, winning popularity for his charismatic acting talent, the beauty of his voice, and his authenticity on stage. This led to him winning various competitions, prizes, and scholarships, such as the UNISA Voice Competition and the ATKV Music Competition. He was also nominated as a finalist in the Belvedere singing competition in Vienna, Austria.

In 2006 le Roux was part of the Resident Artist Program of the Nationale Reisopera in Enschede, the Netherlands, where he sang the role of Pedrillo in The Abduction from the Seraglio, an opera by Wolfgang Amadeus Mozart. In the following year 2007, he marked his European stage debut. His success in the role of Don Ramiro in G. Rossini's La Cenerentola, at the World Youth Opera Schloss Weikersheim in Germany, guaranteed new engagements and further productions in Europe.

In 2007 he became part of the chamber opera in Munich, and in the following years, 2008 and 2009 Le Roux sang as the youngest member of the ensemble at the State Opera of Meiningen in Germany. After working as a concert and opera singer in South Africa, the Netherlands, France, the Czech Republic, Russia, Norway, and Poland, Jacques le Roux finally relocated permanently to Austria. Since 2010/2011 he is part of the fixed opera ensemble of the state theatre in Linz, Austria. In 2013, he played a key role in the opening of the new opera house in Linz where he sang the leading male role in the world premiere of the Philip Glass opera The Lost. He has sung the leading male roles in the world and European premieres of composers such as Ernst Ludwig Leiter, William Bolcom, Moritz Eggert , and Helmut Schmidinger.

Awards 
Jacques le Roux won 2010 the "Ulrich-Burkhardt-Förderpreis“ of the South Thuringia State Theatre Meiningen, which declared him the artist of the year 2010. 2016 he was nominated for the Austrian Music Theatre Price for his interpretation of Peter Quint in Benjamin Britten’s “Turn of the Screw”. After he records Bellini's Canzone di Camara, the south German newspaper stated that Jacques le Roux is a musical event of the world ranking.

Discographies 
 Philip Glass: Spuren der Verirrten (The Lost) | DVD 
 Philip Glass: Spuren der Verirrten (The Lost) | CD
 Bellini: Songs – Canzone – Lieder | CD

References

External links 

Living people
1981 births
North-West University alumni
South African tenors
People from KwaZulu-Natal